WTCR may refer to:

 WTCR-FM, a radio station (103.3 FM) licensed to Huntington, Virginia, United States
 WZWB, a radio station (1420 AM) licensed to Kenova, West Virginia, United States, which held the call sign WTCR from 1955 to 1983 and from 1985 to 2018
 World Touring Car Cup, an international touring car championship result of the adoption of TCR regulations by Eurosport Events following the end of the WTCC